Edward Graham Mellish Chaplin  (born 21 February 1951) is a British diplomat, notable for serving as British ambassador in occupied Iraq from April 2004. Until January 2011 he served as British ambassador to Italy. He was the former Prime Minister's Appointments Secretary.

Education and personal life
Chaplin was educated at Wellington College, an independent school near the village of Crowthorne in Berkshire, followed by Queens' College, Cambridge, from which he graduated with a BA 1st Class Hons. Degree in Oriental Studies, in 1973.

Married Nicola Helen Fisher. One son, 2 daughters.

Life and career
Chaplin headed the Middle East and North Africa department at the Foreign Office in the 80s, notably being briefly detained and assaulted by the Iranian Islamic Revolutionary Guard Corps in 1987.

Chaplin represented UK at the Nasiriyah conference, where he declared, in April 2003:

In April 2004, after the Invasion of Iraq, Chaplin was appointed ambassador to the Iraqi Governing Council in occupied Iraq.

Chaplin was one of the witnesses of The Iraq Inquiry.

Career highlights
1973 Entered FCO
1975–77 Muscat
1977–78 Brussels
1978–79 École Nationale d'Administration, Paris
1979–81 On secondment to CSD as Private Secretary to Lord President of the council, Leader of the House of Lords
1981–84 FCO
1985–87 Head of Chancery, Tehran
1987–89 FCO
1990–92 On secondment to Price Waterhouse Management Consultants, 1990–92
1992–96 Deputy Permanent Representative, UKMIS Geneva
1997–99 Head, Middle East Department, FCO
2000–02 Ambassador to the Hashemite Kingdom of Jordan
2002–04 Director, Middle East and N Africa, FCO
2004–05 Ambassador to Iraq
2005–06 Visiting Fellow, Centre of International Studies, University of Cambridge
2006–11 Ambassador to Italy

On 1 December 2009, Chaplin gave evidence to The Iraq Inquiry in which he spoke about post-war planning for Iraq.

Sources and references 

Who's Who 2009

Ambassadors of the United Kingdom to Iraq
Living people
Ambassadors of the United Kingdom to Italy
Ambassadors of the United Kingdom to Jordan
1951 births
Companions of the Order of St Michael and St George
Officers of the Order of the British Empire
People educated at Wellington College, Berkshire
Alumni of Queens' College, Cambridge